Nicole Grether (born 17 October 1974) is a badminton player from Germany. She competed at the 2000 Sydney and 2004 Athens Summer Olympics.

Career
Grether competed in badminton at the 2004 Summer Olympics in women's doubles with partner Juliane Schenk.  They defeated Michelle Edwards and Chantal Botts of South Africa in the first round but were defeated by Ann-Lou Jørgensen and Rikke Olsen of Denmark in the round of 16.

As of 2011, she now represents Canada with her partner Charmaine Reid. However, due to Grether still holding a German passport, the duo has been unable to compete as a Canadian team in a number of events. This issue has prevented the pair from qualifying to the 2012 Summer Olympics.

Achievements

European Championships
Women's doubles

European Junior Championships 
Girls' doubles

BWF International Challenge/Series
Women's singles

Women's doubles

 BWF International Challenge tournament
 BWF International Series tournament
 BWF Future Series tournament

References

External links 
 
 Pictures of Nicole at Badmintonfotos.de
 

Living people
1974 births
Sportspeople from Freiburg (region)
German female badminton players
Canadian female badminton players
Olympic badminton players of Germany
Badminton players at the 2000 Summer Olympics
Badminton players at the 2004 Summer Olympics
People from Lörrach (district)